Carré is a surname. Notable people with the surname include:

Albert Carré (1852–1938), French theatre director, opera director, actor, librettist; nephew of Michel Carré
Ambroise-Marie Carré, French Roman Catholic priest, writer and member of the French Academy
Antoine Carré (politician) (born 1943), French politician
Antoine Carré (guitarist), French baroque guitarist and composer
Cyrille Carré (born 1984), French sprint canoeist
Fabrice Carré (1855–1921), French playwright and librettist
Ferdinand Carré (1824–1900), French engineer
Hendrik Carré (1656–1721), Dutch Golden Age painter
Hervé Carré (born 1944), French economist
Isabelle Carré (born 1971), French actress
Jean-Michel Carré, French television director
Jean Nicolas Louis Carré (1770–1845), French general
John le Carré (1931–2020), pseudonym of English writer David John Moore Cornwell 
Lilli Carré (born 1983), American cartoonist
Louis Carré (1925–2002), Belgian footballer and manager
Louis Carré (art dealer) (1897–1977), French art dealer
Louis Carré (mathematician) (1663–1711), French mathematician
Marie Carré (died 1984), French nun and conspiracy theorist
Mathilde Carré, French World War II spy and double agent
Michel Carré, French librettist
Michel Carré (director) (1865–1945), French actor and film director
Olivier Carré (born 1961), French politician
Pierre-Marie Carré (born 1947), French Roman Catholic bishop

See also

Carle, surnames
Carle (given name)
Carree (name)
Carry (name)

French-language surnames

es:Carré